D. S. De Silva was the 30th Auditor General of Ceylon. He was appointed on 14 September 1963, succeeding L. A. Weerasinghe, and held the office until 21 February 1964. He was succeeded by B. L. W. Fernando.

References

Auditors General of Sri Lanka